Travis John Turnbull (born July 7, 1986) is an American professional ice hockey player who is currently playing for the Straubing Tigers in the top-flight Deutsche Eishockey Liga (DEL).

Playing career
As a youth, Turnbull played in the 2000 Quebec International Pee-Wee Hockey Tournament with the St. Louis Blues minor ice hockey team. He later played four years of college hockey at the University of Michigan with the Michigan Wolverines men's ice hockey team, where in his third year he helped his team win the 2007-08 CCHA Championship.

On April 6, 2009, the Buffalo Sabres signed Turnbull to a two-year entry-level contract and assigned him to play for their AHL affiliate, the Portland Pirates. On July 15, 2011 the Sabres re-signed Turnbull, who had arbitration rights, to an extension. On March 23, 2012, Turnbull scored his first NHL goal against the New York Rangers in Madison Square Garden.

After a productive debut 2012–13 season in Germany with Düsseldorfer EG, Turnbull moved to sign a one-year contract campaign with rivals ERC Ingolstadt on May 28, 2013. He helped ERC win the 2014 German national championship, before returning to Düsseldorf for the 2014-15 campaign. In December 2015, he headed to Sweden, signing with SHL side Färjestad BK.

In April 2016, Turnbull agreed to terms on a one-year contract with German team Kölner Haie. In the 2016–17 season, Turnbull was unable to match his career averages posting just 7 goals and 12 points in 35 games with the Sharks. Leaving Kölner at the conclusion of the campaign, Turnbull opted to continue in the DEL, agreeing to a one-year deal with the Iserlohn Roosters on July 7, 2017.

Turnbull played two seasons with the Roosters, before leaving as a free agent following the 2018–19 campaign, signing a one-year contract with his fifth DEL club, the Straubing Tigers, on April 24, 2019.

Turnbull left the Tigers at the conclusion of his contract and continued his journeyman career in the DEL by agreeing to a one-year pact with Schwenninger Wild Wings on March 12, 2020.

Personal
Travis is the son of former NHL player Perry Turnbull. Turnbull was born in the St. Louis area suburb of Chesterfield, when his father was a member of the St. Louis Blues. Turnbull and his wife Kasey have two daughters.

Career statistics

References

External links

1986 births
Living people
American men's ice hockey centers
Buffalo Sabres players
Düsseldorfer EG players
Färjestad BK players
ERC Ingolstadt players
Iserlohn Roosters players
Kölner Haie players
Ice hockey people from Missouri
Michigan Wolverines men's ice hockey players
People from Chesterfield, Missouri
Portland Pirates players
Rochester Americans players
Schwenninger Wild Wings players
Sioux City Musketeers players
Straubing Tigers players
Undrafted National Hockey League players